The Duke of Guise, a Tragedy is a tragedy by John Dryden and Nathaniel Lee, published in 1683.

Characters 

 The King of France.
 Duke of Guise.
 Duke of Mayenne.
 Grillon, Colonel of the Guard.
 Alphonso Corso, a Colonel.
 Belleure, a Courtier.
Royalists.
 Abbot del Bene,
 M. Monfert,
Of Guise's Faction.
 The Cardinal of Guise.
 Archbishop of Lyons.
 Polin,
 Aumale,
 Bussy,
 The Curate of St Eustace,
 Malicorn, a Necromancer,
 Melanax, a Spirit,
 Two Sheriffs,
 Citizens and Rabble, &c.
 Queen Mother.
 Marmoutiere, Niece to Grillon.

History 
Dryden co-operated with Nathaniel Lee in producing the Duke of Guise. The story, which in Dryden's early effort had been intended to suggest a parallel to the English rebellion, was now to be applied to the contest of the court against Shaftesbury and Monmouth. Dryden, however, did his best to extenuate his own responsibility in a Vindication of the Duke of Guise separately published.

The play was first acted on 4 December 1682, and encountered a stormy and dubious, if not an unfavourable, reception. the piece was ultimately enabled to maintain its ground with more general approbation. It was performed by the United Companies, and printed in 1683.

References

Bibliography 
 Hammond, Paul (2004). "Dryden, John (1631–1700), poet, playwright, and critic". In Oxford Dictionary of National Biography. Oxford University Press.  
 Scott, Walter, ed. (1808). The Works of John Dryden, Now First Collected in Eighteen Volumes. Vol. 7. Edinburgh: Printed for William Miller by James Ballantyne and Co. pp. 1–208. 
  
 The Duke of Guise a tragedy: acted by Their Majesties servants / written by Mr. Dryden and Mr. Lee. London: Printed by T. H. for R. Bentley ... and J. Tonson ..., 1683.
 The True History of the Duke of Guise. Extracted Out of Thuanus, Mezeray, Mr Aubeny's Memoirs, and the Journal of the Reign of Henry the Third of France. Published for the Undeceiving Such as May Perhaps be Imposed Upon by Mr. Dryden's Late Tragedy of the Duke of Guise. London: Printed and are to be Sold by R. Baldwin, 1683.

1682 plays
Plays by John Dryden
Plays by Nathaniel Lee